Virophages are small, double-stranded DNA viral phages that require the co-infection of another virus. The co-infecting viruses are typically giant viruses. Virophages rely on the viral replication factory of the co-infecting giant virus for their own replication. One of the characteristics of virophages is that they have a parasitic relationship with the co-infecting virus. Their dependence upon the giant virus for replication often results in the deactivation of the giant viruses. The virophage may improve the recovery and survival of the host organism.

Unlike satellite viruses, virophages have a parasitic effect on their co-infecting virus. Virophages have been observed to render a giant virus inactive and thereby improve the condition of the host organism.

All known virophages are grouped into the family Lavidaviridae (from "large virus dependent or associated" + -viridae).

Discovery 
The first virophage was discovered in a cooling tower in Paris, France in 2008. It was discovered with its co-infecting giant virus, Acanthamoeba castellanii mamavirus (ACMV). The virophage was named Sputnik and its replication relied entirely on the co-infection of ACMV and its cytoplasmic replication machinery. Sputnik was also discovered to have an inhibitory effect on ACMV and improved the survival of the host. Other characterised virophages include Sputnik 2, Sputnik 3, Zamilon and Mavirus.

A majority of these virophages are being discovered by analyzing metagenomic data sets. In metagenomic analysis, DNA sequences are run through multiple bioinformatic algorithms which pull out certain important patterns and characteristics. In these data sets are giant viruses and virophages. They are separated by looking for sequences around 17 to 20 kbp long which have similarities to already sequenced virophages. These virophages can have linear or circular double-stranded DNA genomes. Known virophages in culture have icosahedral capsid particles that measure around 40 to 80 nanometers long, and virophage particles are so small that electron microscopy must be used to view them. Metagenomic sequence-based analyses have been used to predict around 57 complete and partial virophage genomes and in December 2019 to identify 328 high-quality (complete or near-complete) genomes from diverse habitats including the human gut, plant rhizosphere, and terrestrial subsurface, from 27 distinct taxonomic clades.

Host range and replication 
Virophages need to have a co-infecting virus in order for them to replicate. The virophages do not have the necessary enzymes to replicate on their own. Virophages use the giant viral replication machinery to replicate their own genomes and continue their existence. The host range for virophages include giant viruses with double stranded DNA genomes. Virophages use the transcriptional machinery of these giant viruses for their own replication instead of the host's transcriptional machinery. For example, the discovery of the virophage associated with the Samba virus decreased the viruses concentration in the host while the virophage was replicating using the giant virus. The host amoeba also showed a partial recovery from the infection by the Samba virus.

Genome 
Virophages have small double-stranded DNA genomes that are either circular or linear in shape. The size of these genomes can vary depending on the giant virus it infects. Most virophages have genomes around 17–30 kbp (kilobasepairs). Their genome is protected by an icosahedral capsid measuring approximately 40–80 nm in length. In contrast, their co-infecting giant virus counterparts can have genomes as large as 1–2 Mbp (megabasepairs). Some of the largest genomes of virophages are similar to the genome size of an adenovirus.

All virophages known so far have four core genes. They are the virophage-specific major and minor capsid proteins (MCP and mCP), PRO (cysteine protease), and a DNA-packaging ATPase. The two capsids are almost universally found in a conserved block. The MCP has two vertical jelly roll fold domain typical of Bamfordvirae, while the mCP (penton) has a regular jelly roll fold domain.

Taxonomy
The family Lavidaviridae with the two genera, Sputnikvirus and Mavirus, has been established by the International Committee on Taxonomy of Viruses for classification of virophages. It is the sole family under order Priklausovirales (from Lithuanian , "dependent"), which in turn is the sole order under class Maveriviricetes (from Maverick transposons).

Family Lavidaviridae
Genus Sputnikvirus
Species Mimivirus-dependent virus Sputnik
Species Mimivirus-dependent virus Zamilon
Genus Mavirus
Species Cafeteriavirus-dependent mavirus
Unassigned genus
Organic Lake virophage

Additionally, virophage genomes identified from metagenomes have been classified together with the isolate virophages into 27 distinct clades with consistent genome length, gene content, and habitat distribution. Some fragmentary virophage sequences were additionally reported in a Loki's Castle metagenome.

References

Virophages